JSE may refer to:

 JSE Limited or Johannesburg Stock Exchange
 Jacksepticeye, Irish YouTuber
 Jamaica Stock Exchange
 Java Platform, Standard Edition
 Journal of Scientific Exploration
 Journal of Sports Economics
 Journal of Statistics Education
 Journal of Structural Engineering